''Helichrysum'' sp. nov. B is a species of flowering plant in the family Asteraceae. It is found only in Yemen. Its natural habitats are subtropical or tropical dry shrubland and rocky areas.

References

Sp Nov B
Vulnerable plants
Undescribed plant species
Taxonomy articles created by Polbot